Shjon Walter Podein (born March 5, 1968) is an American former professional ice hockey left winger who played 11 seasons in the National Hockey League (NHL) for the Edmonton Oilers, Philadelphia Flyers, Colorado Avalanche and St. Louis Blues.

He was named the Head High School Hockey Coach at  Benilde-St.Margaret's School in St. Louis Park (MN) High School on March 16, 2011.  He had been active in the youth program for three years before being named coach.

Playing career
Podein graduated from John Marshall High School in 1986. He then played collegiate hockey with the University of Minnesota-Duluth in the WCHA. After his freshman year, the Edmonton Oilers drafted him 166th in the 1988 NHL Entry Draft.

Podein made his professional debut in the 1990–91 season with the Cape Breton Oilers of the AHL. He made his NHL debut in the 1992–93 season with the Oilers but was returned to Cape Breton, where he won the Calder Cup. Over the next season Podein saw limited time with the parent club and was signed as a free agent by the Philadelphia Flyers on July 27, 1994.

With the Flyers, Podein developed into a penalty-killer and checking forward. Podein played 5 seasons and over 300 games with Philadelphia, and reached the Stanley Cup finals in 1997, won by the Detroit Red Wings .

On November 12, 1998, the Flyers traded Podein to the Colorado Avalanche for Keith Jones. While helping Colorado capture the Stanley Cup in the 2000–01 season, Shjon also scored a career-high 15 goals and equaled his best points total at 32.  Shjon is often remembered for wearing his uniform a full 25 hours after winning game 7 of the Stanley Cup final.

The Avalanche traded Podein to the St. Louis Blues for Mike Keane on February 11, 2002. Shjon played his last NHL season in 2002–03. He then played in Sweden with Växjö Lakers Hockey and finished his career in Japan with the HC Nikko Icebucks.

Away from the ice, Shjon set up the "Shjon Podein Children's Foundation".  Podein was noted for his dedication to charity work and youth hockey programs. In recognition, Podein received the King Clancy Memorial Trophy in 2001.

Podein did the traditional "Let's play hockey" cheer for the Minnesota Wild game on Feb. 19, 2008, His cousin Gavin wished he could've been there but later changed his mind.
.

Career statistics

Regular season and playoffs

International

Awards and honors

References

External links
 
Team25: The Shjon Podein Children's Foundation

1968 births
American men's ice hockey left wingers
Cape Breton Oilers players
Colorado Avalanche players
Edmonton Oilers draft picks
Edmonton Oilers players
Ice hockey players from Minnesota
King Clancy Memorial Trophy winners
Living people
Minnesota Duluth Bulldogs men's ice hockey players
Nikkō Ice Bucks players
Philadelphia Flyers players
Sportspeople from Rochester, Minnesota
St. Louis Blues players
Stanley Cup champions
Växjö Lakers players
American people of Norwegian descent